Mohammad-Reza Najafi was an Iranian reformist politician and a member of the Parliament of Iran representing Tehran, Rey, Shemiranat and Eslamshahr electoral district.

Career 
Najafi was formerly the cultural manager of Amir Kabir University of Technology and economical deputy of Markazi Province governor.

Electoral history

References

Members of the 10th Islamic Consultative Assembly
1969 births
2020 deaths